Samuel James Christelow  was Archdeacon of Mashonaland from 1932 to 1945.

Upcher was educated at St Boniface Missionary College, Warminster and ordained deacon in 1909 and priest in 1911. After curacies in Bulawayo and  Rusape he was Priest in charge of Selukwe then Hunyani. On his return from Zimbabwe (then called Rhodesia) he was Rector of Loxton from 1946 to 1956.

Notes 

20th-century Anglican priests
Alumni of St Boniface Missionary College, Warminster
Archdeacons of Mashonaland